This is a list of electoral results for the electoral district of Greensborough in Victorian state elections.

Members for Greensborough

Election results

Elections in the 1980s

Elections in the 1970s

|- style="background-color:#E9E9E9"
! colspan="6" style="text-align:left;" |After distribution of preferences

 Preferences were not distributed to completion.

 This result was declared void and a by-election was held on 13 October 1973, in which Monte Vale retained this seat for the Liberal party.

Elections in the 1960s

References

Victoria (Australia) state electoral results by district